Pabstiella  truncicola is a species of orchid plant native to Brazil.

References 

truncicola
Flora of Brazil